Hydroginella angustata is a species of sea snail, a marine gastropod mollusk in the family Marginellidae, the margin snails.

Description
The length of the shell attains 9.2 mm.

Distribution
This marine species occurs off Fiji

References

 Boyer, F., Wakefield, A., McCleery, T., 2003. - The genus Hydroginella (Caenogastropoda: Marginellidae) at bathyal levels from the Fiji Islands. Novapex 4(2-3): 67-77

Marginellidae
Gastropods described in 2003